The 2018–19 Utah Utes women's basketball team represents the University of Utah during the 2018–19 NCAA Division I women's basketball season. The Utes, led by fourth year head coach Lynne Roberts, play their home games at the Jon M. Huntsman Center and are members of the Pac-12 Conference. They finished the season 20–10, 9–9 in Pac-12 play to finish in a tie for sixth place. They lost in the first round of the Pac-12 women's tournament to Washington. They would have clinched the automatic berth to the 2019 Women's National Invitation Tournament, but they declined to participate despite having 20 wins.

Roster

Schedule and results 

|-
!colspan=9 style=| Exhibition

|-
!colspan=9 style=| Non-conference regular season

|-
!colspan=9 style=| Pac-12 regular season

|-
!colspan=9 style=| Pac-12 Women's Tournament

Rankings
2018–19 NCAA Division I women's basketball rankings

See also
2018–19 Utah Utes men's basketball team

References 

Utah Utes women's basketball seasons
Utah
Utah Utes
Utah Utes